Stephen Paul Ingle (22 October 1946 – 16 December 2020) was an English professional footballer who played as a right back.

Career
Born in the Manningham area of Bradford, Ingle began as an apprentice at hometown club Bradford City, before turning professional in 1964. He later played for Southend United, Wrexham, Stockport County, Southport and Darlington, before playing in South Africa with Arcadia Shepherds. With Wrexham he won league promotion in 1970 and was a runner-up in the Welsh Cup.

Later life
Ingle remained in South Africa after his playing career ended, living in Pretoria with his wife and three sons, and working as a lift engineer. In 1995 he fell down a lift shaft and was in hospital for six months.

He died from COVID-19 on 16 December 2020, at age 74, during the COVID-19 pandemic in South Africa.

References

1946 births
2020 deaths
People from Manningham, Bradford
English footballers
Bradford City A.F.C. players
Southend United F.C. players
Wrexham A.F.C. players
Stockport County F.C. players
Southport F.C. players
Darlington F.C. players
Arcadia Shepherds F.C. players
English Football League players
Association football fullbacks
English expatriate footballers
English expatriates in South Africa
Expatriate soccer players in South Africa
Deaths from the COVID-19 pandemic in South Africa